B98.5 may refer to any of the following radio stations:

KBBZ in Kalispell, Montana
KURB in Little Rock, Arkansas
WEBB in Waterville, Maine
WBBO in Ocean Acres, New Jersey
WSB-FM in Atlanta, Georgia